Falmouth Arwenack is an electoral division of Cornwall in the United Kingdom and returns one member to sit on Cornwall Council. The current Councillor is Laurie Magowan, a Labour member. The current division is distinct from those of the same name used from 2009 to 2013 and from 2013 to 2021, after boundary changes at the 2013 and 2021 local elections.

Councillors

2013-2021

2021-present

2021-present division

Extent
The current division represents the east of the town of Falmouth, including Swanpool, Gyllyngvase, Falmouth Docks and Pendennis Point.

Election results

2021 election

2009-2021 divisions

Extent
Falmouth Arwenack represented part of the town of Falmouth, including Swanpool, Gyllyngvase, Falmouth Docks, the Falmouth campus of Falmouth University, and Pendennis Castle. The division was nominally abolished and recreated at the 2013 election but this had only minor effects on the ward. From 2009 to 2013, the division covered 71 hecatres in total; after the boundary changes, it covered 195 hectares.

Election results

2017 election

2013 election

2009 election

Notes

References

Electoral divisions of Cornwall Council
Falmouth, Cornwall